Villa Grove is a city in Douglas County, Illinois, along the Embarras River.  The population was 2,472 at the 2020 census.

History 
Villa Grove was chartered in 1903 after the area was recognized by the Chicago and Eastern Illinois Railroad (C&EI) as being exactly halfway between Chicago and St. Louis. This made it a desirable location for a steam locomotive repair facility. Villa Grove later became the site of a C&EI division headquarters and roundhouse.

Villa Grove was known for its Pancake Festivals in the 1940s, which drew crowds over 10,000. In the 1970s, the festival was replaced by the Ag Days celebration. Ag Days currently offers carnival rides, a car show, a parade, multiple vendors, live music, and a demolition derby.

In 1923, Villa Grove's high school basketball team, the Blue Devils, defeated Rockford 32–29 to win the Illinois High School Boys Basketball Championship.

Villa Grove's historic rail depot was demolished in the predawn hours of Friday, October 29, 1976, despite a city ordinance that was intended to protect the structure. The city later received reparation for the destruction. 

On August 10, 2011, a 100-year-old vacant building on main street in Villa Grove was destroyed by a fire set by a two boys age 14 and 9. At least 15 fire departments responded to the blaze containing it to the original structure. The boys were ordered to pay $126,076 in restitution. The 14-year-old received 3 years probation, 30 days in jail and 100 hours of community service. The 9 year old received 2 years probation and 50 hours community service. State law prohibited jail time for the 9 year old. Adjacent businesses were temporarily displaced due to damage caused by smoke and heat.

Flooding 
Villa Grove's location at the confluence of Jordan Slough and the Embarras River has resulted in flooding during the city's history. In January 1950, Villa Grove was isolated by flooding, more than 1/3 of the city was underwater and the Red Cross reported 100 families were homeless. Another flood in April 1994 left over half of the city's 1,000 homes flooded and the city's water supply was tainted. At one point, portions of main street were 6 feet underwater.

After the severe flooding in 1994 and additional flooding in the following years, a program was implemented to purchase and demolish homes voluntarily from owners in the flood plain. The Federal Emergency Management Agency (FEMA) and the Illinois Emergency Management Agency (IEMA) used the Hazard Mitigation Grant Program (HMGP) to purchase 17 homes in two phases from 1995 to 2000. IEMA noted that when another flood occurred in June 2008, the 17 properties purchased would have again been flooded had they not been purchased and demolished. Additional plans were also made to purchase more flood prone properties after the 2008 flood. After flooding in April 2013, FEMA again provided funding to purchase and demolish eight more homes and one public building in Villa Grove under HMGP.

These improvements have minimized the amount of area impacted by flooding. In 2021, a new bridge was built on Illinois Route 130 over the river. The new bridge is at a higher elevation and allows for better drainage. These improvements have resulted in significantly less flooding in the area in recent years.

Local Economy 
Villa Grove is situated far enough from Champaign-Urbana that it can support several restaurants and businesses. The city currently supports several restaurants, bars, two gas stations, two grocery stores, and a nine-hole golf course and country club. There are several parks that provide various playing fields and the city will be building a new community center in the near future.

City Services 
The City of Villa Grove maintains a full-time administrative staff, public works department, police department, and a paid on-call fire department. The city recently sold its water and sewer utilities to Illinois American Water.

Geography 

Demographics 
As of the 2020 census there were 2,472 people, 992 households, and 621 families residing in the city. The racial makeup of the city was 92.03% White, 0.65% African American, 0.36% Native American, 0.24% Asian, 0.08% Pacific Islander, 1.05% from other races, and 5.58% from two or more races. Hispanic or Latino of any race were 3.16% of the population.

There were 992 households, out of which 39.82% had children under the age of 18 living with them, 50.10% were married couples living together, 7.16% had a female householder with no husband present, and 37.40% were non-families. 28.43% of all households were made up of individuals, and 15.93% had someone living alone who was 65 years of age or older. The average household size was 2.85 and the average family size was 2.32.

The city's age distribution consisted of 18.3% under the age of 18, 9.9% from 18 to 24, 24.7% from 25 to 44, 25.7% from 45 to 64, and 21.7% who were 65 years of age or older. The median age was 43.2 years. For every 100 females, there were 104.1 males. For every 100 females age 18 and over, there were 100.3 males.

The median income for a household in the city was $53,971, and the median income for a family was $69,417. Males had a median income of $41,071 versus $26,915 for females. The per capita income for the city was $27,520. About 12.9% of families and 10.8% of the population were below the poverty line, including 11.4% of those under age 18 and 8.2% of those age 65 or over.

See also 
 People from Douglas County, Illinois for notable people from the area

References

External links
https://villagrove.org/

Cities in Douglas County, Illinois
Cities in Illinois
Populated places established in 1903
1903 establishments in Illinois
Pancake festivals